The System of Rice Intensification (SRI) is a farming methodology aimed at increasing the yield of rice produced in farming. It is a low-water, labor-intensive method that uses younger seedlings singly spaced and typically hand weeded with special tools. We have to go for single seed sowing after 2 3 intensive puddling which increases the root growth. It was developed in 1983 by the French Jesuit Father Henri de Laulanié in Madagascar. The system was not fully tested and spread throughout the rice growing regions of the world until some years later, with the help of a Cornell University political scientist and others.

History and main ideas
The practices that culminated in SRI began in the 1960s based on Fr. de Laulanie's observations. Principles included applying a minimum quantity of water and the individual transplanting of very young seedlings in a square pattern.

SRI concepts and practices have continued to evolve as they are being adapted to rain-fed (unirrigated) environments and with transplanting being sometimes replaced by direct-seeding. The central principles of SRI according to Cornell researchers are:

 Rice field soils should be kept moist rather than continuously saturated, minimizing anaerobic conditions, as this improves root growth and supports the growth and diversity of aerobic soil organisms. 
 Rice plants should be planted singly and widely spaced to permit root and canopy growth to keep all leaves photosynthetically active.
 Rice seedlings should be transplanted when young, less than 15 days old with just two leaves, quickly, shallowly, and carefully, to avoid trauma to roots and minimize transplant shock.

Spread
The spread of SRI from Madagascar has been credited to Norman Uphoff, former director of the Cornell International Institute for Food, Agriculture and Development at Cornell from 1990 to 2005. In 1993, Uphoff met officials from Association Tefy Saina, an NGO set up in Madagascar in 1990 by de Laulanie to promote SRI. He observed SRI for three years and witnessed Malagasy farmers who previously averaged two tons harvest per hectare, averaged eight tons per hectare with SRI. Uphoff was persuaded of the merits of SRI, and in 1997 started to promote SRI in Asia. Uphoff estimates that by 2013 the number of smallholder farmers using SRI had grown to between four to five million. The rapid spread of SRI around the globe, and especially in India, can be partially attributed to the smart communication strategies by its proponents in which several newspapers in India disproportionately provided coverage on SRI and effective coalition building among several national and international organisations.

Evaluation
Proponents and critics of SRI debate the claimed benefits and many questions about it remain unresolved.  Wageningen University has published an article discussing the challenges of evaluating SRI in which a concluding sentence reads, "Although the technical aspects of SRI have been contested, it clearly exists as a real social phenomenon."

A review of the literature by Cornell researchers directly associated with promoting SRI claims that SRI, on average, increased yields 20 to 200%, improved resistance to environmental stresses, and increased carbon sink activity while reducing emissions, making it a triple-win for agriculture, climate security, and food security.

Successes
Proponents of SRI claim its use increases yield, saves water, reduces production costs, and increases income and that benefits have been achieved in 40 countries. Uphoff published an article in the International Journal of Agricultural Sustainability stating that SRI "can raise irrigated rice yields to about double the present world average without relying on external inputs, also offering environmental and equity benefits."

There is some evidence from northern Thailand that SRI has achieved some success there.

A special issue on SRI in the non-scientific journal Paddy and Water Environment collected recent findings in support of SRI.

In 2011 five farmers reported that they had beaten rice yield records; the best was a farmer named Sumant Kumar, who reported setting a new world record in rice production of 22.4 tons per hectare using SRI, beating the existing world record held by the Chinese scientist Yuan Longping by three tons. In 2014 S. Sethumadhavan of Alanganallur, India reported a record yield of nearly 24 tonnes of paddy rice per hectare using SRI. Sabarmatee Tiki reported than in Odisha SRI made the labour process easier for women working in the paddy fields.

Criticism
Critics of SRI suggest that claims of yield increase in SRI are due to unscientific evaluations. They object that there is a lack of detail on the methodology used in trials and a lack of corroborating evidence in the peer-reviewed literature. Some critics suggested that SRI success was unique to soil conditions in Madagascar. Despite these claims, as of 2020 over 1,200 articles and communications about SRI in various countries had been published in scientific journals.

Gallery
SRI farming in Chhattisgarh, India:

See also
Organic farming

References

External links 
 SRI at Cornell University
 SRI information from the International Rice Research Institute
 Rice Knowledge Bank: best management practices for rice production
 SRI - much more than more rice Farming Matters magazine, 29.1, March 2013
 Krishi Usha low-cost weeder developed by Krishi Gram Vikas Kendra and Usha Martin Limited, Jharkhand
 News article on SRI from the BBC
 SRI: Achieving More with Less - A new way of rice cultivation from the World Bank Institute

1983 introductions
Rice
Sustainable agriculture